"Old New Hampshire" is the regional anthem (or state song) of the U.S. state of New Hampshire. The words were written by Dr. John F. Holmes and music composed by Maurice Hoffmann in 1926. "Old New Hampshire" was chosen to be the "official" state song first in 1949, then again in November 1977, by the State Song Selection Board.  New Hampshire has nine "honorary" state songs and no other official songs.

History
In 1926, Dr. John F. Holmes of Manchester wrote the song's lyrics.  Maurice Hoffman, Jr., the Franklin Street Congregational Church organist of Manchester, wrote the music.  The 1941 General Court voted against making it the state song, and the 1943 General Court killed a bill public contest with cash prizes, to pick a state song.  In 1949, the General Court voted in favor of designating "Old New Hampshire" as the state song.

In 1963, the legislature approved "New Hampshire, My New Hampshire", by Julius Richelson and Walter P. Smith of Plymouth, as the "Second State Song".  The "Third State Song", designated by the legislature in 1973, was "New Hampshire Hills", with music by Tom Powers of Detroit, Michigan, son of retired Director Edward Powers of the State Sweepstakes Commission, and the late Paul Scott Mowrer, state poet laureate.

In March 1977, "Autumn in New Hampshire," by Leo Austin of Warner, was added as the "Fourth State Song". The addition of this song coincided with the creation of an interim board to recommend one "official" state song and designate the remainder of songs as "honorary".  

In June 1977, another song law was enacted by the General Court which added four more songs to the listing of state songs, with a stipulation that if none were chosen by the Board as the official state song, they would become "honorary" state songs.  The four songs were: "New Hampshire's Granite State" by Annie B. Currier of Londonderry; "Oh, New Hampshire (You're My Home)" by Brownie Macintosh of Hampton; "The Old Man of the Mountain" by Paul Belanger of Berlin, and "The New Hampshire State March" by Rene Richards of Nashua.

The State Song Selection Board consisted of Rep. Richardson D. Benton of Chester, who was the Board's coordinator; William E. Elwell of Portsmouth, who became chairman, Ted Hebert and Robert F. Thibeault of Manchester, who were all named by the Governor of New Hampshire and Council; Senator Robert F. Bossie of Manchester, named by the Senate President; and Rep. Jane F. Sanders of Alton Bay, named by the House Speaker.  

On November 29, 1977, the announcement of the name of the official song was made in Representatives Hall.  New Hampshire First Lady Gale Thomson, wife of Governor Meldrim Thomson, Jr., drew the choice from a sealed envelope in which the name had been placed by the Board.

In 1983, "New Hampshire Naturally," with words and music by Rick and Ron Shaw, was added to the list of state songs listed in RSA 3:7.

Lyrics
 With a skill that knows no measure,
 From the golden store of Fate
 God, in His great love and wisdom,
 Made the rugged Granite State;
 Made the lakes, the fields, the forests;
 Made the Rivers and the drills;
 Made the bubbling, crystal fountains
 Of New Hampshire's Granite Hills

Refrain
 Old New Hampshire, Old New Hampshire
 Old New Hampshire Grand and Great
 We will sing of Old New Hampshire,
 Of the dear old Granite State

 Built the New Hampshire glorious
 From the borders to the sea;
 And with matchless charm and splendor
 Blessed her for eternity.
 Hers, the majesty of mountain;
 Hers, the grandeur of the lake;
 Hers, the truth as from the hillside
 Where her crystal waters break

Refrain

Honorary state songs

 "New Hampshire, my New Hampshire" with words by Julius Richelson and music by Walter P. Smith.
 "New Hampshire Hills" with words by Paul Scott Mowrer and music by Tom Powers.
 "Autumn in New Hampshire" with words and music by Leo Austin.
 "New Hampshire's Granite State" with words and music by Anne B. Currier.
 "Oh, New Hampshire (You're My Home)" with words and music by Brownie Macintosh.
 "The Old Man of the Mountain" with words and music by Paul Belanger.
 "The New Hampshire State March" with words and music by Rene Richards.
 "New Hampshire Naturally" with words and music by Rick Shaw and Ron Shaw
"Live Free or Die" with words and music by Barry Palmer

External links

Music of New Hampshire
New Hampshire
1926 songs
Songs about New Hampshire